Pentila maculata, the multi-spot pentila, is a butterfly in the family Lycaenidae. It is found in Nigeria, Cameroon, Equatorial Guinea, Gabon and the Democratic Republic of the Congo. The habitat consists of forests.

Subspecies
Pentila maculata maculata (Nigeria: from Lagos to the Cross River loop, western Cameroon)
Pentila maculata pardalena Druce, 1910 (Cameroon, Equatorial Guinea: Bioko and Mbini, Gabon, Democratic Republic of the Congo: Mayumbe, Haut-Uele and Tshopo)
Pentila maculata subochracea Hawker-Smith, 1933 (Democratic Republic of the Congo: Sankuru, Tshopo, Bas-Uele and West Kivu)

References

Butterflies described in 1887
Poritiinae
Butterflies of Africa
Taxa named by William Forsell Kirby